The Autostrada A91, also called Autostrada Roma-Fiumicino, is an Italian motorway which connects Rome to the Fiumicino Airport.

The official "A91" name was assigned in the early 2000s. On many road signs along the route, the characteristic green octagonal marker of the Italian motorways still bears the letter A without number.

History 
The motorway was built by its current operator ANAS and finished in 1959 at the same time as the entry into service of the Airport itself (which took place in different phases between 1956 and January 1961). It was initially classified as a State highway, with the name Strada statale 201 dell'Aeroporto di Fiumicino, and became a motorway in 1969.

On the occasion of the Great Jubilee of 2000, the motorway was enlarged with the construction of the third lane between the Grande Raccordo Anulare and the Airport, with the exception of a small stretch of approximately 4 km (about 2.5 miles) towards Rome. Orange light lamps with red LEDs on the sides of the highway were also installed to increase visibility.

In May 2010 a coplanar roadway was completed, to create connections with the commercial areas which had developed meanwhile in the adjacent areas, such as Parco Leonardo or the new Fiera di Roma.

Toll 
The 2011 Finance Act introduced a direct toll on the motorways and highways managed directly by ANAS, to reduce the service charge due by the State to the company for the management and maintenance of the road network.

The Act provided the introduction of the new toll system no later than December 2011; according to an attached technical report, it was supposed to be a "free flow" or electronic toll instead of traditional gates. Pending the completion of the connected infrastructures (cameras, control room etc.), the toll was temporarily increased (1 euro for cars and 2 euro for heavy vehicles) at the junction with the A12 (Maccarese-Fregene) and at the A12 Rome West barrier. These temporary flat-rate increases were subsequently eliminated, starting from 4 August 2010, following some appeals lodged by local authorities to the Lazio and Piedmont Regional Administrative Courts (TAR), as well as a Decree of the Council of State: in fact, at the junctions and barriers where toll payment was required, users who did not continue on the motorways would also had to pay for their use, while, according to the judges, the toll cannot be a tax but the payment for the actual use of a service.

Route 

The highway is 18.5 km (11.5 miles) long; the stretch from the airport to the junction with the Grande Raccordo Anulare is 11.9 km (7.4 miles) long. The highway is mainly a straight path, except for a curved stretch along a bend of the Tiber (within the Magliana urban zone, in the Portuense neighborhood) and three wide curves along the Viaduct of the Magliana, in the last stretch inside Rome (2,5 km).

A91, along with A24, is the only motorway in Rome which penetrates the city within the Grande Raccordo Anulare.

References

Buildings and structures completed in 1959
Autostrade in Italy
Transport in Rome
Fiumicino
Transport in Lazio